Reginald F. Lewis (December 7, 1942 – January 19, 1993), was an American businessman. He was one of the richest Black American men in the 1980s, and the first Black American to build a billion-dollar company, TLC Beatrice International Holdings Inc.

In 1993, Forbes listed Lewis among the 400 richest Americans, with a net worth estimated at $400 million dollars.

Biography

Early life 
Born in Baltimore, Maryland to Carolyn and Clinton Lewis, Reginald Lewis grew up in a middle-class neighborhood. He won a football scholarship to Virginia State University (VSU) and joined the Alpha Phi Chapter of Kappa Alpha Psi while an undergraduate student. After graduating from VSU with a degree in political science in 1965, he took part in a summer program at Harvard set up by the Rockefeller Foundation that introduced African Americans to the study of law.  While there, he made such an impression that Harvard invited him to attend school that fall.  At the time, this made him the only person in the 148 year history of Harvard Law School to be accepted before even applying.  He completed his Juris Doctor degree there in 1968.

Career 

Recruited to top New York law firm Paul, Weiss, Rifkind, Wharton & Garrison LLP immediately after law school, Lewis left to start his own firm two years later. After 15 years as a corporate lawyer with his own practice, he moved to the other side of the table by creating TLC Group L.P., a private equity firm, in 1983.

His first major deal was the purchase of the McCall Pattern Company, a home sewing pattern business, for $22.5 million. Lewis had learned from a Fortune magazine article that the Esmark holding company, which had recently purchased Norton Simon, planned to divest from the McCall Pattern Company, a maker of home sewing patterns founded in 1870. With fewer and fewer people sewing at home, McCall was seemingly on the decline—though it had posted profits of $6 million in 1983 on sales of $51.9 million. At the time, McCall was number two in its industry, holding 29.7 percent of the market, compared to industry leader Simplicity Patterns with 39.4 percent.

He managed to negotiate the price down, then raised $1 million himself from family and friends and borrowed the rest from institutional investors and investment banking firm First Boston Corp.

Within a year, he turned the company around by freeing up capital tied in fixed assets such as building and machinery, and finding a new use for machinery during downtime by manufacturing greeting cards. He then started to recruit managers from rival companies. He further strengthened McCall by containing costs, improving quality, beginning to export to China, and emphasizing new product introductions. This new combination led to the company's most profitable year in its history. With the addition of McCall real estate worth an estimated $6 million that the company retained ownership of, he later sold McCall at a 90-1 return, resulting in a tremendous profit for investors. Lewis's share was 81.7 percent of the $90 million.

In 1987, Lewis bought Beatrice International Foods from Beatrice Companies for $985 million, renaming it TLC Beatrice International Holdings Inc., a snack food, beverage, and grocery store conglomerate that was the largest African-American owned and managed business in the U.S. The deal was partly financed through Mike Milken of the maverick investment bank Drexel Burnham Lambert. In order to reduce the amount needed to finance the leveraged buyout, Lewis came up with a plan to sell off some of the division's assets simultaneous with the takeover.

When TLC Beatrice reported revenue of $1.8 billion in 1987, it became the first black-owned company to have more than $1 billion in annual sales. At its peak in 1996, TLC Beatrice International Holdings Inc. had sales of $2.2 billion and was number 512 on Fortune magazine's list of 1,000 largest companies.

Philanthropy 
In 1987 Lewis established the Reginald F. Lewis Foundation, which funded grants of approximately $10 million to various non-profit programs and organizations while he was alive. His first major grant was an unsolicited $1 million to Howard University in 1988; the federal government matched the grant, making the gift $2 million, which was used to fund an endowment for scholarships, fellowships, and faculty sabbaticals.

In 1992, Lewis donated $3 million to Harvard Law School, the largest grant at the time in the school's history. The school renamed its International Law Center the Reginald F. Lewis International Law Center, the first major facility at Harvard named in honor of an African American.

While alive, Lewis made known his desire to support a museum of African American culture. In 2005, the Reginald F. Lewis Museum of Maryland African American History & Culture opened in Baltimore with the support of a $5 million grant from his foundation. It is the East Coast's largest African American museum occupying an 82,000 square-foot facility with permanent and special exhibition space, interactive learning environments, auditorium, resource center, oral history recording studio, museum shop, café, classrooms, meeting rooms, outside terrace and reception areas. It highlights the history and accomplishments of African Americans with a special focus on Maryland's African American community. The museum is also a Smithsonian affiliate.

Lewis was counsel to the New York-based Commission for Racial Injustice.

Death 
Lewis died at age 50, from brain cancer. His wife, Loida Nicolas Lewis took over the company a year after his death.

Personal life
Lewis was married to Loida Nicolas Lewis, a Filipina lawyer. They had two daughters, Leslie and Christina. Lewis was Catholic.

A PBS documentary aired in February 2018 and chronicled the life of Lewis.

References

External links
 Reginald F. Lewis official website
 Reginald F. Lewis Museum of African American Culture & History
 Reginald F. Lewis Fellowship - Harvard
 The Lewis College
 Reginald F. Lewis High School - Baltimore
 Reginald F. Lewis Fan Club

Articles
 Reg Lewis, TLC Beatrice international
 Often Said
 Afrocentricnews - TLC Beatrice to Liquidate
 
  http://articles.latimes.com/1989-09-13/business/fi-2062_1_mccall-pattern

Books
 Amazon.com: Books: "Why Should White Guys Have All the Fun?": How Reginald Lewis Created a Billion-Dollar Business Empire
 https://www.amazon.com/America-Wrong-Donald-L-Barlett/dp/0836270010/ref=sr_1_1?s=books&ie=UTF8&qid=1347210532&sr=1-1&keywords=america+what+went+wrong
 Amazon.com: Books: Reginald F. Lewis Before TLC Beatrice: The Young Man Before The Billion-Dollar Empire, by Lin Hart https://www.amazon.com/Reginald-Lewis-Before-Beatrice-Billion-Dollar/dp/0985347929/ref=sr_1_1?ie=UTF8&qid=1452631776&sr=8-1&keywords=Reginald+F.+Lewis+Before+TLC+Beatrice

1942 births
1993 deaths
African-American businesspeople
American chief executives of food industry companies
African-American lawyers
African-American non-fiction writers
American businesspeople in retailing
American business writers
American financiers
American grocers
American manufacturing businesspeople
American real estate businesspeople
Businesspeople from Maryland
American drink industry businesspeople
Deaths from brain cancer in the United States
Harvard Law School alumni
Maryland lawyers
Businesspeople from Baltimore
Virginia State University alumni
Virginia State Trojans football players
20th-century American non-fiction writers
20th-century American businesspeople
Paul, Weiss, Rifkind, Wharton & Garrison people
20th-century American lawyers
20th-century African-American writers
African-American Catholics